Michael Geoffrey King (born 15 February 1950) is an English professional golfer.

King was born in Reading, Berkshire. As an amateur, he won the Lytham Trophy in 1973, and played in the Walker Cup in 1969 and 1973.

King began a career as a stockbroker, but following the stock market crash of 1974 he became a professional golfer. He spent many years on the European Tour. 1979 was his best season by far: he won his sole European Tour title at the SOS Talisman TPC; was joint runner-up in the Belgian Open; made only appearances in the Ryder Cup and the World Cup; and finished the year in fifth place on the European Tour's Order of Merit. His career was curtailed by ankylosing spondylitis.

Amateur wins
1973 Lytham Trophy

Professional wins (1)

European Tour wins (1)

Results in major championships

Note: King only played in The Open Championship.

CUT = missed the half-way cut (3rd round cut in 1976, 1984 and 1985 Open Championships)
"T" = tied

Team appearances
Amateur
Walker Cup (representing Great Britain & Ireland): 1969, 1973
St Andrews Trophy (representing Great Britain & Ireland): 1970 (winners), 1972 (winners)
Commonwealth Tournament (representing Great Britain): 1971
European Amateur Team Championship (representing England): 1971 (winners), 1973 (winners)

Professional
Ryder Cup (representing Europe): 1979
World Cup (representing England): 1979

References

External links

English male golfers
European Tour golfers
Ryder Cup competitors for Europe
English stockbrokers
Sportspeople from Reading, Berkshire
1950 births
Living people